Gunjan Menon is an Indian wildlife film director, camerawoman, and National Geographic Explorer.

Her work predominantly focuses on conservation and human-interest stories and has been broadcast on Animal Planet India, Discovery Channel India, National Geographic, BBC Earth, and Disney+Hotstar. In 2018, she directed, shot and edited The Firefox Guardian, her debut film about the life of the first female forest guardian to work with Red Panda Network in Nepal, which premiered in Bristol, England. The film was noted for highlighting the role of community-driven conservation of red pandas and for having an intersectional and cross-genre approach in natural history storytelling. In 2020, she directed a seven part web-series, Rajasthan Royals, which highlights the lesser-known habitat, species, and communities living in and around the Kumbhalgarh Wildlife Sanctuary. She is currently working on her first feature-length documentary supported by the National Geographic Society.

Gunjan is the recipient of the Jackson Wild Rising Star Award, 2020, given to leaders in nature, conservation and science media.

Education 
Menon graduated in 2018 with an MA in Wildlife Filmmaking from the University of West of England, Bristol, a specialised degree offered in partnership with BBC-Natural History Unit. She received her bachelor's degree in audio visual communication from Symbiosis Centre for Media and Communication, Pune, Maharashtra in 2014.

Career 
In addition to her professional role as a storyteller, Menon is also a conservation communicator and filmmaking mentor. She is a TEDx speaker and been invited as a panellist and speaker to several film festivals and seminars including Jackson Wild in Wyoming, Nature Environment Wildlife Filmmakers (NEWF) Congress in Durban, South Africa, the Green Hub in Tezpur, and several other events in India. She also takes guest lectures and inspires school and college students to use wildlife filmmaking as a tool for change. She is currently a Girls Who Click partner photographer, leading workshops for female-identifying teenagers and a mentor for youngsters wishing to break into the field of wildlife filmmaking. In 2021, she was invited as a speaker to the India Today Conclave in New Delhi as a part of the "Defenders of the Earth" panel to discuss the role young conservationists can play in making environmental concerns a global priority.

Wildlife films

Awards and recognitions

Personal 
 Jackson Wild Rising Star Award 
 Young Achiever Award 2019, U-Special International Campus Film Festival, New Delhi
 National Geographic Storytelling Grant 2021 
 ALT-EFF (All Living Things Environmental Film Festival) Ambassador 
 Jackson Wild Advisory Council Member

Films 
 BAFTA Student Awards Shortlist, 2018
 Best Student Short Documentary — International Wildlife Film Festival, Missoula, Montana, 2018
 Honourable Mention — Jackson Wild, UNEP and CITES World Wildlife Day Showcase, New York, 2020  
 Tarshis Film Award — Animal Film Festival, California, 2018 
 Best National Youth Film — CMS Vatavaran, New Delhi, 2019 
 Best Student Documentary — Woodpecker International Film Festival, New Delhi, 2018 
 Special Jury Award — Smita Patil International Documentary and Short Film Festival, Pune, 2018 
 Best Documentary Short — Independent Shorts Award, 2018 
 Special Mention — International Nature Film Festival Gödöllő - Hungary, 2019
 Best TV Reportage — 35rd Ménigoute Festival International du Film Ornithologique, Ménigoute 2019 
 Best Documentary (student) for The Cyan Confluence' CIHWFF, Bhopal, 2013 
 Finalist — Elements Film Festival, Canada 2018
 Finalist — NaturVision Film Festival, Germany 2018 
 Finalist — Miami Independent Film Festival 2018 
 Finalist — Golden Hollywood International Film Festival, Los Angeles, California 2019
 Finalist, Special Mention by WWF Sassari — Life After Oil International Film Festival, Sardegna 2019 
 Finalist — Latin American Nature Awards, 2020 
 Official Selection, Viva Film Festival, Sarajevo 2019 
 Official Selection, Norwich Film Festival, Norfolk, 2018 
 Official Selection, National Film Festival for Talented Youth, Seattle, 2018
 Annual European Union Film Festival Showcase, 2020 
 Official Selection, Green Film Network Awards, 2020

See also 
 The Firefox Guardian

References

External links 

Indian women documentary filmmakers
National Geographic people
Living people
Alumni of the University of the West of England, Bristol
Year of birth missing (living people)